Credit agreements in South Africa are agreements or contracts in South Africa in terms of which payment or repayment by one party (the debtor) to another (the creditor) is deferred. This entry discusses the core elements of credit agreements as defined in the National Credit Act, and the consequences of concluding a credit agreement in South Africa.

Credit transactions definitions 
Agreement - An “agreement” simply means a contract.

Credit - “Credit” means a deferral or delay of payment of a sum of money to another person, or a promise to pay money. 

Credit provider - A credit provider is the party who supplies goods or services (in terms of an instalment sale agreement, for example), or who pays money (in terms, for example, of a secured or unsecured money loan, overdraft facility, pawn transaction or mortgage loan). The credit provider is often also referred to as “the creditor,” in particular when steps are taken to recover amounts due from the consumer.

Consumer - A consumer is the party to whom goods or services are sold, or to whom money is loaned in any of the examples referred to above. When steps are taken to recover amounts due, the consumer is often referred to as “the debtor.”

Credit agreement 
An agreement is a credit agreement if it provides for a deferral or delay of payment, and if there is a fee or interest charged for the deferred payment. The Act does not require that a credit agreement be in writing and signed by both parties, although this is implied throughout the Act. A credit agreement may be a credit facility, a credit transaction or a credit guarantee (or a combination of these). These three terms are defined in section 8 of the Act.

Credit facility 
A credit facility is an agreement in terms of which a credit provider supplies goods or services, or pays an amount to the consumer. The consumer's obligation to pay the price or repay the money is deferred, in exchange for which the consumer pays interest and fees. Examples of a credit facility are credit advanced

 on an overdrawn cheque account in terms of an overdraft facility; or
 on a credit card account.

Credit transaction 
A “credit transaction” may refer any one of a number of different types of transactions. Most important for present purposes are the follow

Installment agreements - In terms of instalment agreements, movable goods (like furniture, clothing or a car) are sold, the price is paid in instalments, and the item is delivered to the consumer. The consumer becomes owner only once all instalments have been paid.

Unsecured money loans - Unsecured money loans are usually smaller money loans (micro-loans) re-payable in installments, where the lender is given no security for re-payment of the debt. Micro lending as a category of the NCR usually speaks to credit providers that can borrow a maximum amount of R8 000 for a period of up to 6 months.

Pawn transactions - In terms of pawn transactions, money is lent and the borrower provides an item of property as security, the resale value of which is greater than the loan. The creditor is entitled to sell the property if the money is not repaid by an agreed date, and to keep the proceeds of the sale.

Mortgage agreements - Mortgage agreements are money loans secured by the registration of a mortgage bond over land, the proceeds of which are usually used to buy land or housing.

Secured loans - In terms of secured loans, money is paid, and the credit provider receives a pledge of any movable property or something else of value as security for repayment of the loan.

Leases of movable goods - Leases of movable goods—that is, not land or housing—would include, for example, a fax machine or a motor car, with rent being paid in instalments, together with fees and interest. (If interest and fees are not charged, it will not be a credit transaction in terms of the Act). The total instalments will usually amount to the value of the item let. Once all instalments are paid, ownership passes to the consumer. This is contrary to the common law of lease. If, however, the agreement provides that ownership will always remain with the lessor, it will still be a credit transaction in terms of the Act.

Credit guarantees 
In terms of a credit guarantee, a third party agrees to pay to a creditor the amount due by a consumer, on demand (as, for example, in the case of suretyship, in terms of which personal security is provided for the debt of another person resulting from an overdrawn Cheque account).

Incidental credit agreements 
Incidental credit agreements occur when goods or services are provided to a consumer over a period of time and a fee or interest is charged only if payment is not made by an agreed date. Examples include

 accounts for municipal services, such as water or electricity; and
 sales of clothing where no interest is charged provided that the account is paid by a certain date.

Incidental credit agreements do not fall under the definition of credit agreements

National Credit Act 
The National Credit Act tries to regulate closely every sector of the consumer credit market. The last provisions of the Act became effective on June 1, 2007. The Act repealed the Usury Act and the Credit Agreements Act, and bears very little resemblance to these Acts. All consumer credit law is contained within the Act, which applies to all credit agreements and all credit providers.

Important consumer credit institutions 
National Credit Regulator - Much of the responsibility for implementing the purposes of the Act lies with the National Credit Regulator (NCR), which oversees the entire consumer credit industry, including all the functions and responsibilities of the former Micro-finance Regulatory Council (in the micro-lending context). The NCR is an independent organisation governed by a Board, with a Chief Executive Officer who may appoint inspectors and investigators.

National Consumer Tribunal - The National Consumer Tribunal is an independent body, separate from the NCR. It has jurisdiction throughout South Africa, and comprises a chairperson and at least ten other members appointed by the President. A tribunal of record, it conducts its proceedings in public in an informal, inquisitorial manner. It applies principles of natural justice, and has the function of ruling on any matter brought before it in terms of the Act. The Act provides rules of practice, procedure, evidence and a list of possible orders in relation to the Tribunal.

Registers - The NCR is required to establish and maintain two important registers:
 a register of certain persons; and
 a national register of credit agreements.
Register of certain persons - Credit providers, credit bureaus and debt counsellors are required to register with the NCR. Before a credit provider enters into a credit agreement (threshold is R zero) it has to register with the NCR. The NCR has the power to suspend or cancel registration in certain circumstances. 

National register of credit agreements - The NCR may be required by the Minister to establish a single national register of outstanding credit agreements, but it has not done so yet. Once established, credit providers will have to submit the following information in relation to every credit agreement:
 names and addresses of the credit provider and the consumer;
 the registration number of the credit provider;
 the identity number of the consumer;
 the principal debt under a credit agreement;
 the credit limit under a credit facility; and
 the amount and schedule of the monthly installments payable.

Certain information regarding credit agreements entered into prior to the coming into effect of the Act must also be provided. This register will be accessible to any person on application in the prescribed form. It will also provide a way of monitoring South Africa's consumer debt levels, which the NCR is required to do.

Credit bureau - A credit bureau is an entity that is engaged for payment in the business of receiving reports or investigating credit applications and agreements, payment history or patterns, and other consumer credit information. 

Debt counselors - Debt counselors are not defined in the Act. The NCR's “Debt Counsellor Training Program Learners’ Guide” describes the debt counselor as “a registrant who is required to do certain tasks stipulated in the Act including facilitating, investigating, and recommending solutions for over-indebtedness.”

Consumer courts - Consumer courts are tribunals established by provincial legislation. The Act allows these courts to be used in various circumstances. There is only one instance where these courts operate at the same level as the National Consumer Tribunal, which is when the NCR refers a complaint to it. Most provinces have introduced their own legislation, but only Gauteng presently has a properly-functioning consumer court.

Ombuds - The Act uses the gender-neutral term “ombud” (often known as ombudsman). The Act provides that certain disputes between a financial institution (like a bank) and a consumer, arising from a credit agreement, may be referred to the relevant ombud. The ombud will then act as mediator between the institution and the consumer with a complaint.

Conclusion of credit agreements

Pre-agreement disclosure 
Before concluding a credit agreement, the credit provider must give to the consumer, free of charge, a statement and quotation in the form prescribed by the Regulations (Form 20 to the Regulations, in the case of small credit agreements). No agreement is entered into at this stage; the consumer does not have to sign anything or pay any fee. 

This document must contain the financial details of the proposed agreement (like the amount of credit provided, the number and amount of installments payable, interest and other fees, deposit required and credit insurance). Consumers must accept or reject the quotation within five business days, giving them a chance to shop around for better or cheaper credit. Once the consumer has accepted the quotation, the credit agreement itself can then be concluded.

Form and contents of credit agreements 
The form of the document that records the credit agreement is prescribed by regulation, and varies for different-size credit agreements. The details required for a small credit agreement (a principal debt of less than R15 000) are set out in Form 20.2 to the Regulations. 

The credit provider must give to the consumer, free of charge, a copy of the signed credit agreement (in paper form or printable electronic form).

Credit agreements may be altered only in very specific circumstances, most importantly in relation to the reduction or increase in credit limits.

Rights and duties of consumers and credit providers 
Many consumer rights are contained in the Act, but very few rights for credit providers. (By contrast, credit providers have many duties.) The Act is biased towards consumers, because it seeks to redress imbalances inherent in our common law. This is not unusual for legislation of this kind.

Right to apply for credit and non-discrimination 
Every adult person has the right to apply for credit, but no-one has the right to be granted credit. A credit grantor may choose to refuse credit for reasonable business reasons, but may not unfairly discriminate against a consumer relative to other consumers on the grounds of race, religion, pregnancy, marital status, ethnic or social origin, gender, sexual orientation, age, disability, culture, language, etc. A consumer may ask for reasons for the refusal of credit, which must be given by the credit provider in writing.

Right to understandable language - The consumer has the right to be given a quotation and credit agreement in an official language that he reads or understands, to the extent that this is reasonable. Any documents where no form is prescribed must be in plain language (language which an ordinary consumer with average literacy skills and minimal credit experience will understand).

Rights regarding information held by credit bureau - Credit bureaux are obliged to check with other sources that the information given to them by credit providers is correct. Consumers have the right to have information relating to rescinded judgments expunged (removed) from the records of credit bureaux. Likewise, a consumer who has satisfied all his obligations in terms of a debt rearrangement has the right to have the fact that a debt rearrangement previously existed removed from these records.

A credit provider must advise a debtor before reporting unfavourable information to a credit bureau. Any person may challenge the accuracy of any information reported to or held by a credit bureau. The credit bureau or NCR is then obliged to investigate at no charge and rectify any incorrect information.

Protection against marketing practices - The Act contains a number of rules in this regard:
 The advertising and marketing of credit must contain prescribed information on the cost of credit (interest and all other charges).
 Negative-option marketing (in terms of which an agreement will automatically come into existence unless the consumer declines an offer) is not permitted.
 Advertisements must not be misleading, fraudulent or deceptive.
 Credit providers may not harass anyone, or try to coerce or persuade anyone to apply for credit.
 Credit sales at a person's home are strictly prohibited, unless
 the sale of credit occurs during a pre-arranged visit for that purpose by the consumer; or
 the provision of credit is incidental to the sale of goods or services.
 A credit provider may require that a consumer have credit life insurance during the existence of a credit agreement, but has a duty to ensure that suitable options for insurance cover are offered to the consumer.
Right to confidentiality and privacy - Credit bureau are required to protect the confidentiality of consumer credit information that they hold or report on. Credit providers must also present to consumers the options of being excluded from telemarketing campaigns, marketing or customer lists sold or distributed and mass distribution of e-mail or SMS messages.

Right of cooling-off - In certain circumstances, consumers may terminate agreements (in writing and properly delivered) within five business days of signing them. This cooling-off right applies only to leases and instalment agreements that are concluded at a location other than the registered business premises of the credit provider. Typically, this right will apply to credit sales on instalments (as in the cases of cars, books, household appliances) concluded at the consumer's home or place of work. The consumer must return the goods bought, and the credit provider must refund amounts paid by the consumer within seven days of termination, less the following:
 reasonable costs of return and repair of damages after sale;
 rent for use of the goods, unless they are still in their original packaging; and
 compensation for depreciation in value of the goods (by agreement or court order only).
Early settlement and repayments - Consumers are entitled to settle their debts in advance at any time, with or without advance notice, after requesting a statement from the credit provider of the amount required to settle the account. No settlement charge is payable for small agreements; interest and other fees are payable only until date of settlement. This means that a consumer may request from the credit provider the balance due, pay the entire amount, and not be penalised for doing so.

This, however, does not apply to large agreements such as mortgage bonds. 

Surrender of goods - A consumer may, at any time, return to a credit provider goods that are subject to a credit agreement, whether or not the consumer is in default. The credit provider must then sell the goods and use the proceeds to settle the account. In terms of the former Credit Agreements Act, this procedure applied only when the consumer was in default. This new provision gives the consumer an extraordinary right, enabling him to rid himself of the agreement when he chooses to.

Statements of account - The Act contains detailed provisions regarding statements of account. The Regulations prescribe the form and content of statements in the case of small agreements. Credit providers must deliver to consumers periodic statements of account, usually once a month (but once every two months for instalment sale agreements).

Credit providers are also obliged to provide consumers with statements of account on request, at no charge. The consumer may choose how the statement must be delivered:

 orally (in person, or by telephone); or
 in writing (in person, by SMS, by mail, by fax or by email—provided that the credit provider has these facilities).

Credit providers need not give written statements on demand more than once every three months.

Right to apply for debt review and re-structuring of debt 
These provisions are explained in detail below.

Duty to report location of goods - In the case of certain credit agreements (typically installment agreements), the consumer becomes the owner only once the full purchase price has been paid, and the credit provider has a right to repossession on breach of the agreement. Until then, the credit provider has an interest in the whereabouts of the goods.

Rights of credit providers - The credit provider's most important rights are
 the right to enforce the agreement;
 the right to receive payment of the credit extended, together with agreed interest and fees; and,
 upon breach of contract, the right to cancel the agreement and recover any goods sold.

A credit provider may suspend a credit facility (like a credit card or cheque account) at any time if the consumer is in default, or otherwise close the facility on ten business days’ notice.

A credit provider who has incurred costs in the attachment of goods while enforcing a debt may ask a court to order the consumer to pay the costs of attachment. The court will make such an order only if the consumer provided false information about his address or the location of the goods.

Duties of credit providers - Every consumer right entails a duty on the part of credit providers. The duties on credit providers are onerous; they provide many administrative burdens. Some of the credit provider's more important duties are
 to register as a credit provider once it has 100 credit agreements or a book debt of R500,000;
 to make a credit assessment of the consumer;
 to give to the consumer a pre-agreement statement and quotation;
 to give to the consumer a copy of the agreement;
 to give to the consumer periodic statements of account, and further statements on request;
 to protect the confidentiality of information about consumers;
 to report to the NCR, or to a credit bureau, the details of every credit agreement concluded, as well as the termination of the agreement when the debt has been paid in full;
 to propose to the consumer to seek advice when the consumer is in default;
 to maintain records of credit applications, agreements and accounts as prescribed in the Regulations;
 to sell goods subject to a credit agreement as soon as possible, for the best price possible, should the consumer request it, and to provide the consumer with a financial statement.

Over-indebtedness and reckless credit

Over-indebtedness 
A consumer is over-indebted if the available information indicates that the consumer is unable to pay the amounts due under a credit agreement in time. When deciding whether or not a consumer is over-indebted, a court must consider the consumer's

  financial means (primarily income);
 financial prospects (income-earning potential);
 other debt; and
 history of debt repayment.

In any court proceedings, a court may declare a consumer to be over-indebted. Alternatively, a debt counselor may have a role in one of two ways:

 A court may refer a consumer to a debt counselor for a recommendation as to whether or not the consumer is over-indebted.
 A consumer may apply in person to a debt counselor to be declared over-indebted (although this is not permitted if the credit provider has already taken steps to recover the debt). The consumer must apply by completing and submitting Form 16 to the Regulations. The consumer must provide details of the debt and pay a fee of R50 to the debt counselor.

A debt review must then take place. The debt counselor must notify all credit providers and credit bureau listed in the application; they must co-operate fully with the debt counselor. The debt counselor must then evaluate the consumer's indebtedness. 

A credit agreement may be declared to be reckless only if the consumer is found to be over- indebted. If the debt counselor finds that the consumer is not over-indebted, but is of the view that one or more credit agreements are reckless, these agreements may not be declared to be reckless. Credit providers may therefore still enforce credit agreements that are in fact reckless, but they may not be formally declared to be reckless.

While this process is under way, a consumer may not use his credit facility (for example, his credit card); nor may he enter into another credit agreement. A credit provider who enters into a credit agreement with a consumer while the consumer is under debt review runs the risk of the credit agreement's being declared reckless credit.

Also, if a consumer is in default under a credit agreement, and the credit provider has already commenced debt-enforcement proceedings, that agreement may not be subject to the debt review. This could encourage credit providers to start proceedings to recover debt earlier than they otherwise might have done.

The debt-review procedure might well be used by shrewd consumers to delay or avoid payment under a credit agreement. This is so because there are many provisions in the Act which limit the rights of credit providers to enforce debts under review. However, if the consumer is in default under a credit agreement subject to review, the credit provider may give notice to the consumer, the debt counsellor and the NCR to terminate the review. This notice may be given at least sixty days after the date of application for debt review: that is, if the debt-review process is dragging on too long. The credit provider may then take steps to enforce the agreement. The court then has the discretion to order that the debt review resume if appropriate. An application for debt review by a consumer has serious implications for the consumer as to his creditworthiness and the conclusion of future agreements.

Reckless credit 
A credit provider must not enter into a reckless credit agreement with a consumer. Before entering into a credit agreement, a credit provider must first take reasonable steps to assess the consumer's

 general understanding of the risks and costs of the proposed credit;
 debt repayment history; and
 existing financial means, prospects and obligations.

A credit agreement is reckless

 if, at the time it was concluded, the credit provider failed to conduct the necessary assessment (described above), irrespective of what the outcome of the assessment might have been; or
 if the credit provider entered into the agreement despite the fact that information available to the credit provider after the assessment showed that
 the consumer did not generally understand the consumer's risk and the costs or obligations under the proposed credit agreement; or
 the conclusion of the agreement would cause the consumer to become over-indebted.

This provision helps to prevent credit providers from taking shortcuts by simply accepting seemingly creditworthy debtors at face value. A credit provider may use its own assessment mechanisms, provided these are fair and objective. The consumer, in turn, must fully and truthfully provide the requested information. Failure by the consumer to do so could provide the credit provider with a complete defence to an allegation of reckless credit granting.

In any proceedings that concern credit agreements, a court may declare that a credit agreement is reckless, in which case the court may make an order

 setting aside all or part of the consumer's rights and obligations under that agreement (so that, for example, the consumer may not have to repay a loan or pay the instalments on a credit sale at all); or
 suspending the force and effect of the agreement for a specific period.

If a court declares that a specific credit agreement is reckless, it must also decide whether or not the consumer is over-indebted at the time of the court proceedings. All the debt of the consumer must be considered. If the court finds the consumer to be over-indebted, it may make an order

 suspending the force and effect of that agreement for a specific period; and
 restructuring the consumer's obligations under any other credit agreements.

While an agreement is suspended (not set aside),

 the consumer is not required to pay anything in terms of the credit agreement;
 no interest or fee may be debited to the consumer; and
 the credit provider's rights in terms of the agreement are unenforceable.

After the period of suspension ends, all the parties’ rights and obligations are revived and become enforceable again. However, interest or fees that would normally have accrued during the period of suspension may not be charged to the consumer. This is a drastic remedy indeed.

The reckless-credit provisions do not apply to a number of credit agreements, including

 a school loan;
 a student loan; and
 an emergency loan.

A student loan, for example, could be granted to an unemployed consumer, who might not have a credit record (so that the credit provider does not know his payment history). The consumer might not be creditworthy, and there is no security. The nature of these agreements excludes them from being reckless lending.

The negative results for credit providers of either

 contracting with over-indebted consumers; or
 concluding reckless credit agreements

are serious. Many of the provisions are designed to penalise credit providers. Credit providers will be very careful to reduce the risk of bad debt. These provisions are therefore likely to reduce over-indebtedness and reckless credit granting, at least in the formal sector. A negative result for consumers, however, could be that credit grantors will be much more reluctant to grant credit in the future, and that, therefore, fewer people will be able to access credit. Further, this could lead to an increase in the number of unregistered and illegal credit providers.

The cost of credit 
It is critical that one understand the full implications of the new cost-of-credit provisions in the National Credit Act and Regulations.

Interest rates until 1 June 2007 - Until June 1, 2007, the Usury Act (which has now been repealed by the National Credit Act) prescribed limits on the interest rates that credit providers could charge. Until this date, the maximum interest rate was twenty per cent per year on all credit agreements up to R10,000 and seventeen per cent per year on credit agreements over R10,000. However, registered micro-lenders were made exempt from the Usury Act from 1992, meaning that they were entitled to charge whatever interest rates they liked. This resulted in exorbitant interest rates, with micro-lenders charging typically thirty per cent per month (or 360 per cent per year)—eighteen times more than the limit of twenty per cent per year for other credit.

The cost of credit in terms of the National Credit Act 
The National Credit Act prescribes limits on interest rates for all forms of credit, including micro-loans. However, the Act introduces other fees (the initiation fee and the service fee) which cause the total cost of credit to remain extremely high. No longer is it sufficient to consider only interest rates. Interest rates, initiation fees and service fees must all be carefully calculated in order to work out the total cost of credit for borrowers. 

Interest - Different interest rates apply to different categories of credit agreements:

Short-term credit transactions - “Short-term credit transactions” are agreements up to R8,000 repayable within six months; usually these are micro-loans. The maximum interest rate permitted is five per cent per month, or sixty per cent per year.

Unsecured credit transactions - “Unsecured credit transactions” are agreements for which there is no security for the debt at all (like loans or sales on credit). There is no limit on the amount or repayment period. Unsecured agreements for more than R8,000 and/or repayable over more than six months fall into this category. The maximum interest rate is linked to the South African Reserve Bank (SARB) Repurchase Rate ((Repurchase Rate x 2.2) + 20% per year)

Credit facilities - Secured bank loans, credit card or cheque accounts fall under the category “credit facility.” The maximum interest rate is also linked to the SARB Bank Repurchase Rate, and is currently 29.8 per cent per year.

Developmental credit agreements - “Developmental credit agreements” are credit agreements entered into to develop a small business, an educational loan, or a loan for purposes of building low-cost housing. The maximum interest rate is 38.8% per year.

Mortgage bond agreements - For mortgage bond agreements, the maximum interest rate is 24.9 per cent per year.

The initiation fee

The initiation fee is intended to cover the costs of initiating a credit agreement, although it is not clear exactly what costs the fee is intended to cover. It is a once-off payment made by the consumer on conclusion of the credit agreement or payable in instalments (as a separate loan attracting interest).

The maximum initiation fee in terms of the Regulations is R165 per credit agreement, plus ten per cent of the amount of the agreement in excess of R1,000, but never to exceed R1,050. Also, the initiation fee may never exceed fifteen per cent of the principal debt.

The service fee

The service fee is defined as a fee that may be charged periodically (usually monthly) by a credit provider in connection with the routine administrative cost of maintaining a credit agreement. The maximum service fee in terms of the Regulations is R60 per month, or R720 per year. The same “flat-rate” maximum service fee of R60 is applicable to all categories and sizes of credit agreements. It appears that the service fee was standardised in order to simplify the application of the Act, justifiable on the basis that every loan, no matter what its size, needs to be administered.  

The smaller the loan, the more expensive will be the service fee relative to the loan. 

Maximum limits and probable market costs

The prescribed interest rates and fees are maximum amounts only. The Department of Trade and Industry hopes that the credit industry will not “jump to the maximum rates”, and has said that it has the power to adjust these rates quickly if necessary.

Legal remedies provided by the Act 
The Act provides only a relatively short list of offences that attract criminal penalties. By contrast, the Usury Act provided that any person who contravenes any provision of the Act commits an offence. Thus, for example, it was a criminal offence to charge interest higher than the Usury Act maximum, which is no longer the case.

However, the Act does provide a number of civil legal remedies for consumers, some of which are drastic departures from previous law. The most important of these remedies are outlined below.

Unlawful credit agreements - Section 89 lists a number of credit agreements that are unlawful, If a credit agreement is found to be unlawful, a court must order
 that the credit agreement is void;
 that the credit provider refund to the consumer any monies paid by the consumer, with interest; and
 that the credit provider's rights to recover monies paid or goods delivered to the consumer be cancelled or forfeited to the State (if the court is of the view that the consumer would otherwise be unjustifiably enriched).

The credit provider will not get back the money lent or property sold, and the court does not have a discretion to order this. This is a drastic remedy and a departure from the common law. It was not previously available in the case of unregistered micro-lenders, and is a significant new remedy readily available to consumers.

Unlawful provisions of credit agreements - Section 90 lists numerous provisions of credit agreements (as opposed to the entire agreements) that are unlawful and not permitted. .An unlawful provision is void. Whenever a court has a matter before it which concerns a credit agreement that contains an unlawful provision, the court may

 sever (remove) the unlawful provision from the credit agreement;
 alter the provision to render it lawful; or
 even declare the whole credit agreement unlawful and make orders similar to those provided for unlawful credit agreements, set out above (another major departure from the common law).

The consumer alleging the unlawful provision is entitled to apply to court for orders in these terms.

Duplum rule -  This rule states that, while a consumer is in default, all credit costs will stop being added to the debt when their total equals the unpaid balance of the principal debt. 

Reckless credit and over-indebtedness - Other legal remedies for consumers already discussed above include
 a court order declaring a loan agreement to be reckless, which could result in the setting aside of all or part of the borrower's rights and obligations under the agreement, or the suspension of the force and effect of the agreement for a determined period; and
 a finding that a consumer was over-indebted at the time of the conclusion of the agreement, in which event the court may order the suspension of the force and effect of the agreement and the restructuring of the consumer's obligations under any other credit agreements.

Dispute settlement and debt enforcement

Dispute settlement 
If the Act has been contravened, a person has one of two options:

 to lodge a complaint with the NCR; or
 to make use of one of the other dispute-resolution mechanisms established by the Act.
Lodging a complaint with the NCR - The Act contains detailed provisions regarding the role of the NCR. Complaints to the NCR must be lodged by completing and submitting to the NCR Form 29 to the Regulations. The NCR may resolve complaints lodged with it; the resolution may become a consent order by a court or the Tribunal. The NCR may also refer the dispute to a debt counsellor, an ombud with jurisdiction or a consumer court. After investigating the matter, the NCR may refer the matter to a provincial consumer court or the Tribunal for an order allowed by the Act.

Other dispute-resolution methods - Alternatively, disputes may be referred for resolution directly to the relevant ombud if the credit provider is a financial institution (like a bank), to a consumer court or to an alternative dispute resolution agent. With the consent of the parties, the resolution may be recorded in writing and made an order of court or the Tribunal. In his book The National Credit Act Explained, Otto concludes,All in all, the muscle of the National Credit Regulator, the far-reaching powers of the National Consumer Tribunal and the courts, the almost paternalistic protective inclination of the legislature, and the extensive network of dispute-solving account for consumer legislation that is going to have a huge impact on the enormous credit industry in South Africa.

Debt enforcement 
The Act limits the credit provider's common-law rights to enforce debt: that is, to claim what is due in terms of the credit agreement. This is in line with international consumer legislation, but the Act's provisions have been criticised as being unusually cumbersome and detrimental to credit providers.

Default notice to the consumer - If a consumer is in default, the credit provider must notify the consumer of his default in writing. This is effectively a letter of demand. The notice must do more, however: The credit provider must propose to the consumer that the consumer refer the credit agreement to, among others, a debt counsellor to resolve the dispute or agree on a plan to get payments up to date.

As regards the method of delivery of the written default notice, the consumer may choose to be informed in one or more of these ways:

 in person at the credit provider's business premises;
 at any other place chosen by the consumer, at the consumer's expense; or
 by ordinary mail fax or email or printable web-page.

Must the default notice actually reach the consumer to be effective? The Constitutional Court held in Sebola v Standard Bank that the Act, although it gives no clear meaning to “deliver,” requires that the credit provider, in seeking to enforce a credit agreement, must aver and prove that the notice was delivered to the consumer. Where the credit provider posts the notice, proof of registered despatch to the address of the consumer, together with proof that the notice reached the appropriate post office for delivery to the consumer, will constitute sufficient proof of delivery (in the absence of contrary indication).

Debt procedures in court - A credit provider may go to court to enforce a credit agreement only if
 the consumer has been in default for at least 20 business days;
 at least ten business days have elapsed since the credit provider delivered the default notice;
 the consumer has not responded to the notice or responded by rejecting the proposals in the notice;
 the consumer has not surrendered to the credit provider the goods subject to the credit agreement him/herself (in the case of an instalment agreement, secured loan or lease agreement).

The twenty days and ten days referred to above may run concurrently: that is, the ten-day period may occur during the 20-day period.

Where a case has been referred to the National Consumer Tribunal, debt counsellor, ombud, alternative-dispute-resolution agent or consumer court, or the credit agreement is subject to a debt review, the court will adjourn the case.

A much larger number of requests for default judgment on credit agreements now have to be referred to a magistrate, rather than being dealt with by the clerk of the court. This will greatly increase the workload of the magistrates, and could cause debt enforcement procedures to take much longer, resulting in frustration for credit providers.

Attachment and sale of goods - If a credit provider properly cancels a credit agreement, the court may order the attachment of the goods, allowing for the sale of the goods to settle the account. This procedure follows the usual common law. If the proceeds of the sale are not sufficient to settle the account, the credit provider may approach the court for an order to recover the outstanding balance. This applies in the case of the instalment agreement, secured loan or lease. Strangely absent from this list is the mortgage agreement. This implies that the mortgagee (a bank, usually) will be able to rely only on the proceeds of the sale of the property to settle the account-even if this is insufficient, and even if the mortgagor (the debtor) is very wealthy and has other assets that could be attached.

Interim attachment orders - Common practice is that a credit provider asks the court for an “interim attachment order,” pending cancellation of the agreement, in order to protect goods at risk (like a motor car) from deterioration or damage. This order will allow the sheriff to attach the goods for safekeeping until such time as the court action is finalised, which can take a long time. It is not clear from the Act whether or not credit providers will still be able to obtain interim attachment orders. The past practice of obtaining such orders may well continue.

Re-instatement of credit agreement by consumer - At any time before cancellation, a consumer may reinstate a credit agreement that is in default by paying all amounts overdue, plus default charges and the costs of enforcing the debt to date. The consumer may then repossess property attached, but not if the goods have already been sold.

Surrender of goods - The consumer may choose at any time to surrender the goods that are subject to the credit agreement, whether or not the consumer is in default. This provision is discussed in detail above.

Unlawful collection practices - A credit provider may not use an identity document, credit or debit card, access card or PIN to enforce a credit agreement or collect on the agreement. A contravention of this provision is a criminal offence.

See also 

 Credit (finance)

 South African law
Credit counseling

Notes 
 Otto The National Credit Act Explained (LexisNexis, 2006).
 JW Scholtz et al. Guide to the National Credit Act [looseleaf] (LexisNexis, 2011).

References 

South African business law
Law of obligations